The 1926 Hampden–Sydney football team represented Hampden–Sydney College during the 1926 college football season. The 1926 team was coached by Yank Bernier in his ninth season (third consecutive) as the head coach of the Tigers. The squad finished the season with a final record of 5–2–3.

Personnel

Coaching staff

Roster

Schedule

Season summary

Virginia

Richmond

The Tigers trounced the Spiders in Richmond to a final score of 20–7.

Florida

The Gators and the Tigers fought to a scoreless tie. Tommy Owens suffered a broken collarbone.

References

Hampden–Sydney
Hampden–Sydney Tigers football seasons
Hampden–Sydney Tigers football